Alex Gordon was a police agent recruited by Herbert Booth, of P.M.S.2. (related to MI5)  in 1916 to infiltrate the labour and anti-war movement which was proving more effective after the introduction of conscription in the United Kingdom.

Gordon's first assignment was the infiltration of the Industrial Workers of the World. 

Months after a "most repellent incident" 'Gordon' being "withheld from the witness-box in the Wheeldon trial after being used as an instrument for getting a conviction", The Nation (edited by Henry William Massingham) demanded: "who set this man to work? what is his identity?"

In the House of Commons, William Anderson MP continued asking questions about 'Gordon''s work, finishing with: "whether an assurance will be given that 'Alex Gordon' will not in future be employed in any capacity by the government".

References

Further reading 
Jackson, John 'Losing the plot. Lloyd George, F.E.Smith and the trial of Alice Wheeldon', History Today, May 2007, pages 42-49.
Undercover police agents
Year of birth missing
Year of death missing
World War I spies for the United Kingdom